The caatinga puffbird (Nystalus maculatus) is a species of bird in the family Bucconidae, the puffbirds, nunlets, and nunbirds. It is endemic to Brazil.

Taxonomy and systematics
The Caatinga puffbird was described in 1648 by the German naturalist Georg Marcgrave in his Historia Naturalis Brasiliae. In his Latin text Marcgrave used the name Matuitui which was the local name for the bird in the Tupi language. A series of later ornithologists based their own descriptions on that by Marcgrave. These include Francis Willughby in 1678, John Ray in 1713, Mathurin Brisson in 1760, the Comte de Buffon in 1780, and John Latham in 1782. 

When the German naturalist Johann Friedrich Gmelin revised and expanded Carl Linnaeus's Systema Naturae in 1788 he included the caatinga puffbird and cited descriptions by earlier ornithologists. He placed it with the kingfishers in the genus Alcedo and coined the binomial name Alcedo maculata. The specific epithet is Latin and means "spotted" or "blotched". In 1807 the caatinga puffbird was accurately described and illustrated from a specimen in the Paris museum by the French naturalist François Levaillant. The caatinga puffbird is now one of six species placed in the genus Nystalus that was introduced in 1863 by Jean Cabanis and Ferdinand Heine.

The International Ornithological Committee (IOC) treats Nystalus maculatus as a monotypic species. However, the South American Classification Committee of the American Ornithological Society (SACC), the Clements taxonomy, and BirdLife International's Handbook of the Birds of the World (HBW) all treat it as the nominate subspecies of spot-backed puffbird, N. m. maculatus.

Description

It has a dark brown crown with bold buffy spangles and a pale rufous collar on the hindneck. Its upperparts and wing coverts are dark brown with buffy spangles and bars. The long, narrow, tail has broad black and narrow buffy bars. The face is mostly off-white with dusky streaks that are darker to the rear; it has a buffy supercilium. The chin is white and the throat, upper breast, and sides of the neck are orange-red. The rest of the underparts are white with bold black spots on the upper breast and black streaks on the flanks. The bill is mostly red, the eye pale yellow, and the feet brownish olive.

The song is an "[u]ndulating 'tewre-tewtewretewtewre'", often sung as a duet or by three birds.

Distribution and habitat
The caatinga puffbird is found in northeastern and central Brazil, as far south as southwestern Mato Grosso. It is a bird of the lowland and foothill cerrado, caatinga, and campo regions. It inhabits a variety of semi-open landscapes including the interior and edges of deciduous woodland, savanna, palm groves, shrub- and scrublands, and pastures. It is thought to be resident year round, though there might be some seasonal wandering in parts of its range.

Behavior

Feeding
The caatinga puffbird hunts by sallying from a low perch to capture prey on the ground or foliage. Its diet is mostly insects including caterpillars.

Breeding
The caatinga puffbird's breeding phenology has not been fully documented. It nests in a leaf-lined cavity in a soil bank or level ground. The clutch size is two or three eggs.

Status
The IUCN follows HBW in treating the caatinga puffbird as a subspecies of spot-backed puffbird; the spot-backed is assessed as being of Least Concern. Taken as a whole, it has a very large range. Its population has not been quantified but is believed to be stable. It appears to be common throughout its range.

Gallery

References

Caatinga puffbird
Birds of the Caatinga
Birds of Brazil
Caatinga puffbird
Caatinga puffbird
Taxonomy articles created by Polbot